Hughes Winborne is a Hollywood film editor. He has edited 20 films, including Crash, for which he won an Oscar for film editing in the 78th Academy Awards.  He also edited Sling Blade (1996) and The Pursuit of Happyness (2006), though his true passion resides in Indie features.

Hughes graduated from the University of North Carolina at Chapel Hill in 1975 (with a bachelor's degree in history). After working for several years, he enrolled in a film program at New York University and discovered film editing.

Winborne has been elected as a member of the American Cinema Editors.

Selected filmography

References

Further reading

External links

American Cinema Editors
Best Film Editing Academy Award winners
University of North Carolina at Chapel Hill alumni
Tisch School of the Arts alumni
Living people
American film editors
Ravenscroft School alumni
1953 births